Yunusovo (Yunıs) is a rural locality (a village) in Verkhnekiginsky Selsoviet, Kiginsky District, Bashkortostan, Russia. The population was 161 as of 2010. There is 1 street.

Geography 
Yunusovo is located 7 km south of Verkhniye Kigi (the district's administrative centre) by road. Verkhniye Kigi is the nearest rural locality.

References 

Rural localities in Kiginsky District